Picea maximowiczii, the Japanese bush spruce, is a species of conifer in the pine family.  It is endemic to Japan; its range is limited to Akaishi Mountains, Okuchichibu Mountains and the Yatsugatake Mountains on Honshu.

References

maximowiczii
Endemic flora of Japan
Trees of Japan
Endangered flora of Asia
Taxonomy articles created by Polbot